Lemyra infernalis is a moth of the family Erebidae. It was described by Arthur Gardiner Butler in 1877. It is found in China (Zhejiang, Shaanxi, Liaonin, Jiangxi, Beijing, Hubei, Hunan), Taiwan, Japan and possibly Assam, India.

References

 

infernalis
Moths described in 1877